Liang Chen and Wang Yafan were the defending champions, but lost in the final to Varatchaya Wongteanchai and Yang Zhaoxuan, 4–6, 6–4, [10–7].

Seeds

Draw

References 
 Draw

Malaysian Doubles
Malaysian Open (tennis)